Bismarck René Montiel Ávalos (born 5 March 1995) is a Nicaraguan footballer who plays as a defensive midfielder for Diriangén FC and the Nicaragua national team.

International
He made his Nicaragua national football team debut on 10 March 2016 in a friendly against El Salvador.

He was selected for the 2017 CONCACAF Gold Cup squad.

References

External links
 
 

1995 births
Living people
Association football midfielders
Association football defenders
Nicaraguan men's footballers
Sportspeople from Managua
Nicaragua international footballers
2017 CONCACAF Gold Cup players
Nicaraguan Primera División players
Managua F.C. players
Juventus Managua players
Real Estelí F.C. players
Diriangén FC players